Medium Rarities is a compilation album by American metal band Mastodon. It was released digitally and on limited edition vinyl on September 11, 2020 via Reprise Records. The album is a collection of rare tracks that include covers, instrumental versions of previous songs, and live recordings. Its opening track, a new song titled "Fallen Torches", was released on July 31, 2020. The song features Scott Kelly from Neurosis for his final guest appearance with Mastodon before his withdrawal from the public eye that was not announced until August 2022.

Critical reception

In a positive review, Kerrang! stated the album "certainly underlines the band’s extraordinary ability to shape-shift" and highlighted the song "Fallen Torches" as a "heroic attempt to salvage 2020 via monolithic riffs and an outro thunderous enough to crack planets."

Track listing

Personnel
 Brann Dailor − drums, percussion, vocals
 Brent Hinds − guitars, vocals
 Bill Kelliher − guitars
 Troy Sanders − bass, vocals
 Scott Kelly − additional vocals on "Fallen Torches"

Charts

References

Mastodon (band) albums
2020 compilation albums